Bourseul (Gallo: Bórsoeut) is a commune in the Côtes-d'Armor department of Brittany in north-western France.

The Arguenon river flows through the commune.

Population

Inhabitants of Bourseul are called Bourseulais in French.

See also
Communes of the Côtes-d'Armor department

References

External links

Communes of Côtes-d'Armor